Charlotte Chatton (born 1975) is an English actress. She is best known for the role of Emma in Dr. Quinn, Medicine Woman (1996), Genevieve L'Merchant in the Sci-Fi/Action/Horror (1996) film Hellraiser IV: Bloodline, Madeleine Astor in Titanic (1997), Peggy in Stand-ins (1997), and as Jen Cross in Dakota Road (1992).

Chatton has been working in recent years as a producer and scriptwriter, and, in 2009, founded The Next Level Script, a professional screen writing service.

Her father is keyboardist Brian Chatton.

Filmography

Film

Television

References

External links

1975 births
English film actresses
English television actresses
Living people
Actresses from London